Ingrid Johana Hernández Castillo (born 29 November 1988 in Bogotá) is a Colombian race walker.

Career
She competed in the 20 km kilometres event at the 2012 Summer Olympics.

Personal bests

Achievements

References

External links
 
 

Sportspeople from Bogotá
Colombian female racewalkers
1988 births
Living people
Olympic athletes of Colombia
Athletes (track and field) at the 2012 Summer Olympics
Pan American Games medalists in athletics (track and field)
Pan American Games bronze medalists for Colombia
South American Games gold medalists for Colombia
South American Games medalists in athletics
Athletes (track and field) at the 2011 Pan American Games
Competitors at the 2010 South American Games
Central American and Caribbean Games bronze medalists for Colombia
Competitors at the 2014 Central American and Caribbean Games
Central American and Caribbean Games medalists in athletics
Medalists at the 2011 Pan American Games
21st-century Colombian women